Vadi-e Rahmat (Benefaction Valley) is the main cemetery of Tabriz, East Azerbaijan, Iran.  Located in the southeastern part of the city, it is served by a road line which connects it to the southern highway of Tabriz. Many Iranian soldiers  from Tabriz who died in the Iran–Iraq War are buried there.

Notable burials
 Abolhassan Eqbali Azar (fa) (1863–1971) – singer
 Kazem Saadati (fa) (1940–1971) – Marxist activist
 Abdolali Karang (fa) (1923–1979) – writer
 Jafar Khamenei (ru) (1887–1983) – political activist
 Morteza Yaghchian (fa) (1956–1983) – member of IRGC
 Salamullah Javid (1900–1986) – politician
 Mahmoud Farnam (fa) (1871–1993) – musician
 Ali Bakhshayesh (fa) (1916–1998) – singer
 Abdollah Vaez (fa) (1926–2000) – scholar
 Mohammad-Ali Erteghaei (fa) (d. 2002) – calligrapher
 Ebrahim Bakht-Sholouhi (fa) (1941–2006) – calligrapher
 Samad Sardarinia (fa) (1947–2008) – scholar
 Jamal Torabi (fa) (1925–2009) – numismatist
 Asghar Roufegar (fa) (1923–2010) – artist
 Manouchehr Mortazavi (fa) (1929–2010) – scholar
 Mohsen Koochebaghi Tabrizi (1924–2011) – cleric
 Saleh Hosseini (fa) (1945–2011) – poet
 Aalaeddin Melmasi (cz) (1952–2011) – photographer
 Bahman Sarkarati (fa) (1937–2013) – linguist
 Mohammad Jarrahi (fa) (d. 2014) – union activist
 Mohammad-Hossein Mobin (fa) (1927–2015) – writer
 Shahrokh Zamani (1964–2015) – union activist
 Imran Heidari (fa) (1956–2018) – singer
 Behrouz Rahbar (1945–2019) – cyclist
 Aylar Haqi (fa)  (1999–2022) – protester

External links
 

Cemeteries in Iran
Buildings and structures in Tabriz